Elizabeth Cynthia Barr (born December 17, 1971), later known by her married name Beth Isaak, is an American former competition swimmer who was a backstroke specialist and Olympic silver medalist.  As a 16-year-old, she represented the United States at the 1988 Summer Olympics in Seoul, South Korea.  She who won a silver medal by swimming the backstroke leg for the second-place U.S. team in the women's 4×100-meter medley relay, together with teammates Janel Jorgensen (butterfly), Tracey McFarlane (breaststroke), and Mary Wayte (freestyle).  Individually, she also competed in the women's 100-meter backstroke, finishing fifth in the event final with a time of 1:02.78, and the women's 200-meter backstroke, finishing fourth in 2:12.39.

Barr grew up in Pensacola, Florida, where she trained with PJC Aquatics (now known as Greater Pensacola Aquatic Club).  As of 2020, she lives in Pensacola.

See also
 List of Olympic medalists in swimming (women)
 List of University of Texas at Austin alumni

References

External links
 

1971 births
Living people
American female backstroke swimmers
Olympic silver medalists for the United States in swimming
People from Crisp County, Georgia
Sportspeople from Pensacola, Florida
Swimmers at the 1988 Summer Olympics
Texas Longhorns women's swimmers
Place of birth missing (living people)
Sportspeople from Phoenix, Arizona
Medalists at the 1988 Summer Olympics